Smooth Rock Falls is an incorporated town in the Cochrane District in Northeastern Ontario, Canada, with a population of 1,330 at the 2016 census.

Geography and transportation
The town lies on the Mattagami River and on Highway 11. The next full-service towns in each direction are Cochrane, about 59 km (37 mi) to the east and slightly south by road, and Kapuskasing, about 65 km (40 mi) to the west and slightly north. Highway 634 connects Smooth Rock Falls northward with the community of Fraserdale, and Highway 655, starting in Driftwood east of Smooth Rock Falls, provides easier access to Timmins, the dominant regional centre, about 102 km (63 m) south by that route.

The town is served by the Ontario Northland Railway for freight service, and by Ontario Northland passenger buses.

Economy

The Smooth Rock Falls economy was dominated by the Tembec Malette pulp mill, which was closed on December 5, 2006. Prior to that, the mill had been in a state of indefinite shutdown since July 31, 2006. The closure of the mill meant the loss of about 210 jobs.

The town of Smooth Rock Falls made a series of announcements regarding community investments since Tembec's departure and the closure of the pulp mill. On July 13, 2007 a joint news conference between the town and the Ontario Ministry of Natural Resources revealed the former Tembec pulp mill would be converted into a value-added cedar plant. Quebec-based Hardy Cedar Lumber took control of the mill and was provided with 50,000 cubic metres of cedar from the province. The cedar project would provide the community with as many as 44 full-time jobs.

One month prior to the cedar announcement, the town made public an investor's plan to build a new seniors retirement home, 80-100 room hotel and establish a new Indian restaurant. Nightingale Premier, an investment company based in Great Britain, first met with town officials in November 2006. The British company made its plans for a new seniors home, hotel and restaurant known on June 13, 2007.

In 2017 the town announced incentives to encourage new construction that included up to $2,500 off building permit fees, property tax forgiveness over three years of 100%, 75% and 25% per year and 90% of the market value of building lots. The long closed motel reopened in August 2017.

NorthernTel, Ontera, and Persona Communications provide telecommunications services.

Demographics

There has been a steady population decline in Smooth Rock Falls with every five-year census since 1986; the town's population decreased by 45.7% between 1986 and 2021.

Politics
Smooth Rock Falls is part of the provincial electoral district of Mushkegowuk—James Bay and the federal electoral district of Algoma—Manitoulin—Kapuskasing. Its Member of Provincial Parliament is Guy Bourgouin, a New Democrat, and its Member of Parliament is Carol Hughes. Bisson's constituency office serves Smooth Rock Falls locally with weekly hours at Town Hall.

Health care
The Smooth Rock Falls Hospital includes 14 acute care and 23 long-term care beds, and its Cochrane District Detoxification Centre serves the larger region.

Education
District School Board Ontario North East operates
Smooth Rock Falls Public School (JK-6)
Smooth Rock Falls Secondary School
Conseil scolaire catholique de district des Grandes-Rivières operates
L'École catholique Georges-Vanier.

For postsecondary education, a Contact North distance education access centre serves the town. The Smooth Rock Falls Resource Centre offers Adult Education for those who want to upgrade or finish their grade 12 secondary school diploma.

Media
CKGN-1, a repeater of CKGN-FM Kapuskasing, provides community radio service for the Franco-Ontarian population.

Attractions
Town attractions include the Reg Lamy Cultural Centre, which includes a hockey arena and Smooth Rock Falls Curling Club; the Smooth Rock Falls Golf Course (9 holes), a public library, bowling alley (5 pin) and a public swimming pool.

Each year the town hosts the Smooth Truck Fest, a popular festival that features truck pulls and other motorized pull contests alongside children's activities, concerts, canoe races and much more.

Notable people

Notable people from Smooth Rock Falls include:
Jeffrey Buttle, figure skater
Louise Pitre, singer and actress
J. P. Parisé, NHL/ Team Canada 1972 hockey left winger, and father of NHL hockey forward Zach Parise
Charlotte L'Écuyer, Quebec politician and current Member of National Assembly of Pontiac
Dick Mattiussi, NHL and AHL hockey player.
Grant Martin, NHL and AHL hockey player.

See also
List of francophone communities in Ontario

References

External links

Municipalities in Cochrane District
Single-tier municipalities in Ontario
Towns in Ontario